Heartstrings or Heart Strings may refer to:

 The chordae tendineae

Film and television
 Heart Strings (1917 film), an American drama film directed by Allen Holubar
 Heart Strings (1920 film), an American drama film directed by J. Gordon Edwards
 Heartstrings (1923 film), a British silent romance film
 Heartstrings (2009 film), a British animated film
 Heartstrings (2016 film), a French romantic comedy
 Heartstrings (South Korean TV series), a 2011 South Korean television series
 Heartstrings (American TV series), an American anthology television series
 Heartstrings (Hong Kong TV series), a 1994 Hong Kong television series, starring Aaron Kwok and Gigi Lai

Music
 The Heartstrings, earlier name of The Heartbeats

Albums
 Heart String (Earl Klugh album), 1978
 Heartstrings (Howling Bells album), 2014
 Heartstrings (Leighton Meester album), 2014
 Heartstrings (Willie P. Bennett album),  1999
 Heart Strings (Linda Lewis album), 1974
 Heart Strings (Bonnie Tyler album), 2003
 Heart Strings (Moya Brennan album), 2008

Songs
 "Heartstrings" (Janet Leon song), 2013
 "Heart Strings" by Oh Wonder from Ultralife, 2017
 "Heartstrings" by Leighton Meester from Heartstrings, 2014
 "Heartstrings" by Berlin from Count Three & Pray, 1986
 "Heartstrings" by M-22 featuring Ella Henderson, 2022

See also
 String (disambiguation)